The 1985–86 BHL season was the fourth season of the British Hockey League, the top level of ice hockey in Great Britain. 10 teams participated in the league, and the Durham Wasps won the league title by finishing first in the regular season. The Murrayfield Racers were playoff champions.

Regular season

Playoffs

Group A

Group B

Semifinals
Dundee Rockets 5-4 Durham Wasps
Murrayfield Racers 8-4 Fife Flyers

Final
Murrayfield Racers 4-2 Dundee Rockets

References

External links
Season on hockeyarchives.info

1
United
British Hockey League seasons